Walter Deutsch (born 29 April 1923) is an Austrian musicologist specialising in folk music research.

Life and career 
Born in Bozen/South Tyrol, Deutsch began his education in a seminar for music education in Innsbruck. After the war and captivity, he continued his education first in Innsbruck and then in Vienna.

Deutsch was ballett korrepetitor at the Wiener Volksoper. In 1963, he was appointed as a lecturer at the University of Music and Performing Arts Vienna.

In individual provincial studios of the ORF he still presents programmes concerning folk music, such as the programme Fein sein, beinander bleibn in Carinthia or the programme Fein sein, beinander bleibn in Lower Austria aufhOHRchen – volksmusikalische Kostbarkeiten.

In his honour, the  created the "Walter Deutsch State Prize" in 1994. This prize is awarded every two years in recognition of special achievements in the field of folk music research.

Honours and awards 
 1955: City of Vienna Award for Music
 1956: Theodor Körner Prize for Musik
 1974: Großes Goldenes 
 1992: 
 1993:  in Gold
 1996: 
 2003: Austrian Decoration for Science and Art I. Classe

References

Further reading 
 Uwe Harten/Irene Harten: Walter Deutsch. In Oesterreichisches Musiklexikon. Online edition, Vienna 2002 ff., ; Print edition: vol. 1, Österreichischen Akademie der Wissenschaften printing press, Vienna 2002, .

External links 
 
 Laudatio für Walter Deutsch
 OE-Journal Walter Deutsch
 

20th-century Austrian musicologists
Austrian radio presenters
Austrian television presenters
ORF (broadcaster) people
Recipients of the Austrian Cross of Honour for Science and Art, 1st class
Austrian prisoners of war
1923 births
Living people
People from Bolzano